Boško "The Yugo" Radonjić (17 May 1943 – 31 March 2011) was a Serbian criminal, former leader of the Westies, a predominantly Irish-American gang based in New York's Hell's Kitchen.

Early life
Radonjić was born in 1943 in Užice. Bosko's father, Dragomir, a teacher, was captured and executed during World War II by the Partisans for belonging to the Chetniks led by general Draža Mihailović. Stigmatized as a son of a royalist Chetnik soldier, Radonjić grew up in communist Yugoslavia under Tito.

In his late twenties, Radonjić fled the country and immigrated to the United States in 1970. He used his friendship with Red Star Belgrade footballer Milovan Đorić to sneak onto the team bus headed for Graz, which allowed him to get across the border. After some time in Austria, Radonjić went to Italy before immigrating to the United States.

Bosko Radonjić mentored venture capitalist Dusan Langura and financially backed him up for his first business ventures.

American years
Once in America, Radonjić settled in Hell's Kitchen area of Manhattan in New York City. He also joined the Serbian Homeland Liberation Movement (SOPO), an anti-communist and terrorist organization headed by Nikola Kavaja. Sharing royalist and anti-communist views, the two men became lifelong friends.

Already known to Yugoslav state security UDBA, Radonjić's activities began to be monitored even more closely by its agents. In 1975, Radonjić took part in a bombing at the Yugoslav mission to the United Nations in which no one was hurt. In 1978, he pleaded guilty to conspiracy charges in the 1975 bombing of a Yugoslavian consul's home and for plotting to bomb a Yugoslav social club, both in Chicago.

Upon his release in 1982, Radonjić moved back to New York's West Side and began working as a minor associate of Jimmy Coonan. He seized control of the gang following the imprisonment of many of the Westies leadership during the late 1980s. Under his leadership, he was able to reestablish the Westies' former working relationship with the Gambino crime family under John Gotti, and was involved in the jury tampering during Gotti's original 1986 trial for racketeering. One of the jurors, George Pape, didn't disclose that he was a friend of Radonjić during jury selection. After he was empanelled, he let it be known that he was willing to sell his vote to help acquit Gotti. Gambino capo and future underboss Salvatore "Sammy the Bull" Gravano paid Pape $60,000 to guarantee at least a hung jury. Pape was convicted for his misconduct in 1992 and sentenced to three years in prison.

Radonjić supervised Westie underling Brian Bentley's highly successful burglary ring using two Hispanic gang members until the arrest of Pavle Stanimirović and his group in the early 1990s. He was an associate of Vojislav Stanimirović and his son, Pavle (aka Paul Montana, aka Punch), of the YACS organization. Later investigations under Michael G. Cherkasky, chief of the Investigations Division of the District Attorney's Office, would eventually force Radonjić to flee the United States for good in 1992 to avoid prosecution.

Back in Serbia
Since 1990, Radonjić had already spent a sizeable amount of time in Serbia, mostly dividing his time between Belgrade where he owned a night club named Lotos in Zmaj Jovina Street and Mount Zlatibor where he owned a casino named Palisade and where he also later built a casino named Club Boss located at Kraljeve Vode.

As the Bosnian War broke out, Radonjić became a close adviser to Radovan Karadžić, the Bosnian Serb leader charged with war crimes (on the run from 1996 until 2008), whom Radonjić described in a 1997 Esquire article penned by Daniel Voll as: "My angel, my saint." Due to Zlatibor's close proximity to the Bosnian border, Radonjić also helped the Serbian war effort by providing funds for weapons and equipment as well as by arranging for soldiers to rehabilitate and rest. Throughout this time Radonjić maintained links with Serbian state security service (renamed from UDBA to SDB after the dissolution of SFR Yugoslavia) and its chief Jovica Stanišić with whom he shared a friendship. In autumn 1995, Radonjić was involved in the release operation of two French pilots who were shot down over Bosnia by the Republika Srpska Army and held captive for more than a month.

1999 arrest in Miami
Though based in the Balkans, Radonjić frequently travelled abroad, especially to Caribbean and South American destinations. During one such trip in late December 1999 after almost a decade spent in the former Yugoslavia, Radonjić was arrested by U.S. custom officials in Miami, Florida. Actually, he was on a plane from Europe to Cuba where he was going for New Year's celebrations, but after learning that Radonjić was on the passenger list, the FBI got the plane re-routed to Miami where he was arrested in spectacular manner as the entire airport was shut down.

He had been indicted in 1992 for giving a $60,000 bribe to a juror in the 1987 racketeering murder trial of John Gotti, and thus was held without bail as a wanted fugitive. The charges against Radonjić were dropped after the key witness in his case, Gravano, was arrested for drug related offenses. Gravano had been the Gambinos' intermediary between Radonjić and the corrupt juror, Pape. However, the case against Radonjić was based almost entirely on Gravano's testimony, and Gravano's arrest made prosecutors believe his testimony would not be credible.

Radonjić was freed in March 2001. He immediately left the United States and went back to the former Yugoslavia. In subsequent interviews Radonjić claimed the FBI had ulterior motives for persecuting and harassing him:

During spring 2003, following the assassination of Serbian Prime Minister Zoran Đinđić, Radonjić was arrested and questioned as part of Operation Sablja, a wide-sweeping police action initiated by the Serbian authorities under the state of emergency. After spending three days in prison, Radonjić was released. He died following a brief illness in Belgrade, Serbia on 31 March 2011.

In popular culture
In the 1998 made-for-TV movie Witness to the Mob, a depiction of the life of Sammy the Bull, Radonjić is played by Stephen Payne.
Niko Bellic, the main character of Grand Theft Auto IV, may have been inspired by Radonjić due to both being Yugoslav criminals, with ties to Italian and Irish organized crime.

References

Further reading
Davis, John H. Mafia Dynasty: The Rise and Fall of the Gambino Crime Family. New York: HarperCollins, 1993; 
English, T.J. The Westies: Inside the Hell's Kitchen Irish Mob. St Martin's Paperbacks, 1991;

External links
 James Ridgway de Szigethy, "J.R.'s Mafia Year In Review – 2000", AmericanMafia.com 
 Daniel Voll "Radovan Karadzic: A Deeply Misunderstood Mass Murderer" by 
  Radonjić obituary, nytimes.com, 9 April 2011

1943 births
2011 deaths
Serbian gangsters
Yugoslav emigrants to the United States
American crime bosses
American gangsters
American people of Serbian descent
Westies (New York gang)
Serbian people imprisoned abroad
Prisoners and detainees of the United States federal government
Serbian anti-communists
Abuse of the legal system